Aghajari (also Romanized as Āghājārī and Āghā Jārī; also known as Aghajari-e Zeydūn and Āqā Jarī) is a city and capital of Central District, in Aghajari County, Khuzestan Province, Iran.  At the 2006 census, its population was 13,152, in 2,943 families. Because of the Iran-Iraq War, the city's population dropped from 64,102 in 1986 to around 16,337 in the 1991 census and its population continued to drop long after the 1991 census (held 3 years after the end of the Iran-Iraq War), but according to World Gazetteer the population has slowly grown to 15,153 in 2012, meaning the city's population is extremely far from reaching or getting close to its 1986 population.

Climate
Aghajari has a hot desert climate (Köppen climate classification BWh) with long, scorching hot summers and pleasant to warm, short winters. Aghajari is consistently one of the hottest places on the planet during the summer, with summer temperatures regularly at least , sometimes exceeding  with many sandstorms and duststorms. Winters in Aghajari have no snow.

References

Populated places in Aghajari County

Cities in Khuzestan Province